Nikita Vladimirovich Belunov (born 13 November 1999) is a Russian football player.

Club career
He made his debut in the Russian Football National League for FC Luch Vladivostok on 3 March 2019 in a game against FC Krasnodar-2, as a 72nd-minute substitute for Andrei Chasovskikh.

References

External links
 
 Profile by Russian Football National League
 

1999 births
Sportspeople from Vladivostok
Living people
Russian footballers
FC Luch Vladivostok players
Association football midfielders